Deep End is the first full-length album by American alternative rock band Tsunami, released in 1993.

Production
The album was recorded at Catbox Studios, in Lancaster, Pennsylvania.

Critical reception
Trouser Press wrote: "Toomey and Thomson’s vocal harmonies approach choir-like complexity on 'Lucky' and 'Valentine'; furthermore, the group’s thick, layered arrangements — an intoxicating blur of strummed/dirty guitars, sonorous basslines and catchy melodic hooks — mark Tsunami as pop experimentalists, not ossifying punk rockers."

Track listing
All tracks by Tsunami except where noted.

 "In a Name" – 3:03
 "The Spook" – 0:22
 "Slugger" – 3:29
 "Lucky" – 3:44
 "Water's Edge" (Mark Edwards) – 2:59 
 "Genius of Crack" – 4:17 
 "460" – 3:45
 "Sniffy" – 0:06
 "Valentine" – 4:24
 "Skinny" – 3:26
 "Waxed" – 2:38
 "Writing Letters" – 3:26
 "Stupid Like a Fox" – 10:45

Personnel 
Ken Heltmueller – engineer
John Pamer – drums
Steve Raskin – artwork
Jim Saah – photography
Jay Sorrentino – engineer
Charles Steck – photography
Kristin Thomson – guitar, vocals, artwork
Jenny Toomey – guitar, vox Organ
Andrew Webster – bass guitar, vocals

References

Tsunami (band) albums
1993 debut albums